is the 25th single by the Japanese girl idol group Berryz Kobo. It was released in Japan on March 2, 2011, and debuted at number 7 in the weekly Oricon singles chart.

Track listings

CD single 
 
 
 "Heroine ni Narō ka!" (Instrumental)

 Limited Edition A DVD
 "Heroine ni Narō ka!" (Dance Shot Ver.)
 
 Limited Edition B DVD
 "Heroine ni Narō ka!" (Dance Solo Mix Ver.)

DVD single "Heroine ni Narō ka!" Single V 
 "Heroine ni Narō ka!"
 "Heroine ni Narō ka!" (Close-up Ver.)

Charts

References

External links 
 Profile on the Up-Front Works official website
 Profile of the corresponding DVD single on the Up-Front Works official website

2011 singles
2011 songs
Japanese-language songs
Berryz Kobo songs
Songs written by Tsunku
Piccolo Town singles
Japanese synth-pop songs
Electronic dance music songs
Dance-pop songs